Rence (born Jackson Lawrence Hirsh, February 1, 1998) is an American singer, songwriter and producer based in Los Angeles. Known for his dynamic take on pop music, Rence spent many years cultivating an independent music career before signing to Epic Records in 2019. His breakout single “Baby Blue” garnered 4 million streams in 2018 and has since amassed more than 30 million streams as of July 2022 (as shown on his Spotify artist page).

Career
As an independent artist, Rence garnered nearly 7 million streams and scored acclaim from Zane Lowe on Apple Music 1 with his single, "Ways to Go." Rence studied at New York University's Tisch School of Arts, graduating in 2019 with a Performance Studies major and Business of Entertainment, Media, and Technology minor.

In 2019, he collaborated with Noah Cyrus on “Expensive,” the song that marked his official debut with Epic. Within months, the single reached over 3 million streams and catapulted the artist into new territory with notice by Nylon, Billboard, and Paper. Notably, Rence was featured by Complex magazine's music discovery site, Pigeons and Planes, in their Best New Artists series. Rence performed at Lollapalooza in August 2021 and released his single, “Awooo.” Then in October 2021, Rence released his latest single, "Track Shoes," which has 1.2 million streams as of July 2022 (as shown on Spotify).

Various music writers have described Rence as a genre disruptor because of the breakout star’s ability to transcend genre in his songs. Beyond his solo music, Rence has also collaborated with and produced for a wide range of musicians, including Jonny Orlando, Sarah Barrios, Alex Porat, Chloe Lilac and Johan Lenox.

Management
His booking agent is Zac Bluestone of Wasserman Music, and Rence is managed by Andrew Keller and Mike Ryan.

References

External links
 
 Spotify artist page
 YouTube artist channel
 SoundCloud artist page

Epic Records artists
Living people
American male musicians
Singer-songwriters from Washington (state)
American singer-songwriters
1998 births